Old Escobares is a census-designated place (CDP) in Starr County, Texas, United States. It is a new CDP formed from part of the former Escobares CDP prior to the 2010 census with a population of 97.

References

Census-designated places in Starr County, Texas
Census-designated places in Texas